The Ganzhou–Longyan railway or Ganlong railway is a railway connecting Jiangxi and Fujian Provinces, in southeastern China. Construction began on December 8, 2001, and the line entered operation on October 1, 2005. Major cities and counties along route include Ganzhou, Ganxian, Yudu, Huichang, Ruijin in Jiangxi Province, and Changting, Liancheng, Shanghang, and Longyan in Fujian Province.

The line gives southern Fujian a direct link to the Beijing–Kowloon railway in neighboring Jiangxi, and reduced travel time from Longyan to Beijing by rail from 31 hours to 22 hours. The original route remains in operation for freight only.

Line description
The Ganzhou–Longyan railway passes through mountainous terrain in southern Jiangxi and western Fujian and connects Ganzhou, on the Beijing–Kowloon railway, with Longyan, on the Longyan–Xiamen railway.  The line provides southern Jiangxi with a rail outlet to the sea.  The line's 148 bridges and 121 tunnels account for 35.48% of the line's total length.

Much of region along route was part of the Chinese Communists' guerilla base area in the early 1930s, including Ruijin, the capital of the Chinese Soviet Republic, and Changting, another stronghold of the Jiangxi–Fujian Soviet.  Decades after the Communists departed the region on the Long March and then returned with the founding of the People's Republic, the region lagged in development and remained relatively isolated.  The Ganzhou–Longyan railway was designed to promote economic development and boost tourism to historical sites in the region.

History
A rail line connecting southern Jiangxi and Fujian was originally proposed by Sun Yat-sen and planning began in as early as 1914. The Nationalist government surveyed the region for railway planning in 1935, after driving the Communists from the region, and again in 1947 and 1948, after the end of World War II.  After the winning the Chinese Civil War in 1949, the Communist government inherited the project and produced studies and proposals in 1958, 1963, 1972, 1981, 1983 and 1994.  A feasibility study was finalized in 1997.  Construction began in western Fujian on December 8, 2001, with a ceremony at the meeting site of the Gutian Conference, where the Communist leaders reorganized in 1929 after numerous setbacks in the wake of the Nanchang Uprising.  Track-laying was completed on December 30, 2004, and the line entered operation on October 1, 2005, about one year ahead of schedule.

Originally hoped to open in 2014, it ultimately began operation on December 26, 2015. The original alignment now exclusively carries freight.

Stations 
The line has the following stations: Ganzhou, Yudu, Huichang North, Ruijin, Changting South, Guanzhaishan South, Guitianhuizhi, and Longyan.

Rail connections
 Ganzhou: Beijing–Kowloon railway, Ganzhou–Shaoguan railway, future Nanchang-Shenzhen high-speed railway
 Longyan: Zhangping–Longchuan railway, Longyan–Xiamen railway

See also

 List of railways in China

References

Railway lines in China
Rail transport in Jiangxi
Rail transport in Fujian
Railway lines opened in 2005
Ganzhou
Longyan